= The Poster Workshop =

British artists' collective

The Poster Workshop was a British artists' collective based in Camden Town, London from 1968 to 1971. The group produced posters through screen printing for strikes, civil rights groups and tenants' associations. The group were influenced by the French collective L'Atelier Populaire.
